The cane toad in Australia is regarded as an exemplary case of a "feral species", including rabbits, foxes, cats, and dogs, among others. Australia's relative isolation prior to European colonisation and the industrial revolution, both of which dramatically increased traffic and import of novel species, allowed development of a complex, interdepending system of ecology, but one which provided no natural predators for many of the species subsequently introduced. The recent, sudden inundation of foreign species has led to severe breakdowns in Australian ecology, after overwhelming proliferation of a number of introduced species, for which the continent has no efficient natural predators or parasites, and which displace native species; in some cases, these species are physically destructive to habitat, as well. Cane toads have been very successful as an invasive species, having become established in more than 15 countries within the past 150 years. In the Environment Protection and Biodiversity Conservation Act 1999, the Australian government listed the impacts of the cane toad as a "key threatening process".

Introduction and spread

Native to South and mainland Middle America, cane toads were introduced to Australia from Hawaii in June 1935 by the Bureau of Sugar Experiment Stations, now Sugar Research Australia, in an attempt to control the native grey-backed cane beetle (Dermolepida albohirtum) and French's beetle (Lepidiota frenchi). These beetles are native to Australia and they are detrimental to sugarcane crops, which are a major source of income for Australia. Adult cane beetles eat the crop's leaves, but the main problem is the larvae, which feed on the roots. Adult cane beetles have a heavy exoskeleton and their eggs and larvae are often buried underground, making them difficult to exterminate. Furthermore, conventional methods of pest control, such as pesticide use, would eradicate harmless species of insects, as well, making them unwanted methods. Cane toads were to replace the use of pesticides, such as arsenic, pitch, and copper. The success of using the moth Cactoblastis cactorum in controlling prickly pears in Australia also contributed to hopes for the cane toad.

In June 1935, 102 cane toads (Rhinella marina, formerly ICZN Bufo marinus) were imported to Gordonvale from Hawaii (with one dying in transit due to dehydration). By March 1937, some 62,000 toadlets were bred in captivity and then released in areas around Cairns, Gordonvale, and Innisfail in northern Queensland. More toads were released around Ingham, Ayr, Mackay, and Bundaberg. Releases were temporarily limited because of environmental concerns, but resumed in other areas after September 1936. Since their release, toads have rapidly multiplied in population and now number over 200 million and have been known to spread diseases affecting local biodiversity. The introduction of the toads has not only caused large environmental detriment, but also no evidence indicates that they have affected the cane beetles which they were introduced to prey upon.

The spread of cane toads was slow at first, but by 1959, they had colonised most of Queensland's east coast. In 1964, they appeared in the Gulf of Carpentaria. By 1978, they had reached the border with New South Wales. By 1984, they had reached the Queensland/Northern Territory border. In March 2001, the invasion front entered the wetlands of heritage-listed Kakadu National Park, and by 2009, the toads were within reach of the Northern Territory/Western Australian border. They have also spread south into northern New South Wales, with one isolated community in Port Macquarie and were found in Sydney at Tarren Point in the south of the city. By 2019, they had become a pest in the Torres Strait Islands, probably carried there by boat.

The toads on the western frontier of their advance have evolved larger legs; this is thought to be related to their ability to travel farther. As a consequence of their longer legs, larger bodies, and faster movement, about 10% of the leading-edge cane toads have also developed arthritis.

In 2023, Rangers discovered a big cane toad in Queensland which is bigger than any other toad ever seen.

Ecological effects

The long-term effects of toads on the Australian environment are difficult to determine, but some effects include "the depletion of native species that die eating cane toads; the poisoning of pets and humans; depletion of native fauna preyed on by cane toads; and reduced prey populations for native insectivores, such as skinks."

Precipitous declines in populations of the northern quoll (Dasyurus hallucatus) have been observed after toads have invaded an area. A number of cases of declines in goanna and snake populations have been reported after the arrival of toads. For example, local populations of Varanus panoptes dropped by up to 90% when their habitat was invaded by cane toads. The preliminary risk assessment of cane toads in Kakadu National Park stated that the predation of the cane toad by native wildlife is the greatest risk to biodiversity. Other factors, such as competition with native wildlife for resources, and the predation of the cane toad on native wildlife, were considered much lower risk factors, but requiring further study. In the Northern Territory, goanna deaths resulting from poisoning after predation on cane toads has been linked to a rise in the number of undamaged saltwater crocodile eggs.
Cane toads were present within a few days of the crocodiles hatching in April 2007.

Numerous native species have been reported as successfully preying on toads. Some birds, such as the black kite (Milvus migrans), have learned to attack the toad's belly, avoiding the poison-producing glands on the back of the head. Anecdotal reports in the Northern Territory suggest that a native frog, Dahl's aquatic frog (Litoria dahlii), is able to eat the tadpoles and live young of the toad without being affected by the poison that often kills other predators. This may account for slower than expected infestations of toads in certain areas of the Northern Territory, although later research carried out jointly by several Australian Universities casts doubt on these reports. Some snake species have been reported to have adapted smaller jaws so that they are unable to swallow large cane toads, which have large quantities of poison.

Another study, however, notes that the cane toad is adapting to a wider environmental range and may in the future be spreading into habitats currently not available.

In 2009, the native meat ant was found to be immune to the toad's poison and can successfully prey upon young cane toads. Whereas native frogs and toads have natural reflexes to avoid the meat ants, the cane toads do not tend to try to escape the ants, rather standing still when attacked waiting for the toxin to kill the attacker.

New research has indicated that cane toads prey on dung beetles by nestling in cow pats and waiting for the beetles, eating up to 150 in one meal. In areas where cane toads have free access to water in dams, the dung beetles have been decimated. This indicates that the cane toad has the potential to economically affect the cattle industry through increased disease in cattle.

Predator effects
Predators in Australia are not adapted to the cane toad's toxin, which is its main defense mechanism. Because of this, toads do not tend to hide and are usually targeted by predators, which then expose themselves to the toxic effects. One study suggests Australian reptiles are greatly threatened by invasion of the cane toad, more so than any other group. Two species of crocodiles and around 70 species of freshwater turtles were found to be at risk of invasion, and all species studied were found capable of eating a toad large enough to kill them. All freshwater turtles and crocodiles are predicted to share part of their future distribution with the invasive species by 2030. Australia's varanids and agamids are also at a great risk.

One native freshwater turtle species, Myuchelys latisternum (saw-shelled turtle), which ranges along rivers and streams from Cape York Peninsula to northern New South Wales, is reported to be one of the few native animals that is a successful predator of cane toads. The larger the animal, or predator, is the better chance it has of survival, as its body weight effectively dilutes the concentration of the toxin in its body. There are reports of one native species, the Torresian crow, eating cane toads without ingesting the poison by flipping it onto its back and eating its non-toxic innards via its underside. In 2014, researchers found evidence that the Australian freshwater crocodile (Crocodylus johnstoni) had learned to eat just the hind legs of cane toads. One research study concluded that in less than 75 years, the red-bellied black snake had evolved in toad-inhabited regions of Australia to have increased resistance to toad toxin and decreased preference for toads as prey.

Evidence exists for native predator species adapting to the presence of the cane toad, through learning or evolutionary selection, but the initial drop in population is often steep and can reduce biodiversity on a population level. One proposed solution is to use "teacher toads", or smaller toads that are less likely to kill predators. These toads would allow predators to learn not to eat the toads while mitigating mortality. Some have even proposed adding some chemical to make the toads distasteful to further discourage predation. These efforts have shown some promising results so far.

A study to be published in the Ecology journal states that the invasion of cane toads in a case study area caused a trophic cascade over a period of five years. The resident predators, the monitor lizards, ate the cane toads and died, which resulted in a boom in the population of the lizards' typical prey, crimson finches.

Richard Shine is using behavioural conditioning techniques to teach the northern quoll to avoid cane toads.

In 2019, the native rakali or Australian water rats (Hydromys chrysogaster) were found to have learned to make an incision to eat the cane toads' hearts and livers, while avoiding their lethal skin and glands. The water rats were able to adapt the hunting strategies within two years of the cane toads' introduction into their territory.

Methods to control invasion in Australia
Currently, most attempts to curtail the invasion of cane toads have been unsuccessful. Many of these strategies involve the physical trapping of toads, but these methods also capture unintended native species. Since the largest selective pressure on cane toads currently is intraspecies competition, these physical removals often only improve the conditions for untrapped toads. Also, since migration is high, any area purged of toads would most likely be reinvaded quickly.

Many new ideas have been proposed to control the cane toad population. Some have suggested introducing a native viral or bacterial pest of the toads, but this has potential to once again invade native species. Two similar strategies have been proposed, both of which focus on fecundity. One involves the release of sterile males into the population. These males would compete for resources with other males, while themselves not being able to reproduce. A second strategy would be to insert a gene in female toads, which would allow them to only create male offspring. In theory, this would limit the reproductive rates and control the population. Determining the efficacy and dangers of these approaches is difficult, as these methods have never been attempted, especially on a large scale.

On 13 June 2012, news reports cited a new research breakthrough regarding cane toad control. Cane toad tadpoles are attracted to the toxin produced by adults and spawn as they are believed to cannibalize toad spawn as a food source. Researchers used cane toad toxin to successfully lure cane toad tadpoles, implying that in controlled areas, tadpoles could be captured and eradicated.

In semiarid areas where water is scarce, the construction of toad-proof fences around dams can severely affect toad survival rates by denying them access to water.

The RSPCA has guidelines for the humane culling of cane toads. Inhumane ways include spraying with Dettol, phenyl, and using a large hammer with a flat, metal head to bludgeon them to death, but these are illegal in most states and territories (for NT, QLD, and NSW, no laws prohibit inhumane ways, just recommendations). Due to concerns over potential harm to other Australian wildlife species, the use of Dettol as pest control was banned in Western Australia by the Department of Environment and Conservation in 2011.

Large predators, such as the yellow-spotted monitors and sand goannas, are being fed young, small, cane toads by researchers to create a "food poisoning"-like experience for the predators, in the hope that they will avoid eating adult toads, which might kill them.

Poisonous sausages containing toad meat are being trialed in the Kimberley (Western Australia) to try to protect native animals from cane toads' deadly impact. The Western Australian Department of Environment and Conservation has been working with the University of Sydney to develop baits to train native animals not to eat the toads. By blending bits of toad with a nausea-inducing chemical, the baits train the animals to stay away from the amphibians. Researcher David Pearson says trials run in laboratories and in remote parts of the Kimberley region of WA are looking promising, although the baits will not solve the cane-toad problem altogether.

Novel uses

Attempts have been made to make use of dead cane toads, which can number in the thousands and cause hygiene problems. This includes processing the carcasses into liquid fertilisers.

Their skin can be made into leather, and novelty cane-toad purses made of the fore body and abdomen have been made. In the Torres Strait Islands, where the toads arrived around 2014, one entrepreneur is tanning the hides to create a durable leather, and creating luxury fashion handbags from the skins.

In popular culture
The cane toad has been listed by the National Trust of Queensland as a state icon of Queensland, alongside the Great Barrier Reef, and past icons, the Royal Flying Doctor Service and the backyard mango tree (also an introduced species).

"Cane toad" is also a colloquial term for an inhabitant of Queensland, particularly the state's State of Origin rugby league team members and supporters.

In Australian states where the cane toad is common, some "sports" have developed, such as cane-toad golf and cane-toad cricket, where cane toads are used as balls. In April 2005, Dave Tollner, a Northern Territory Member of Parliament, called for legalisation of attacks on cane toads. This was criticised by many animal and conservation groups, who claim freezing is a more humane way to kill cane toads than hitting them with cricket bats. Townsville holds an annual "Toad Day Out", where the community learn about and catch cane toads, with prizes for the largest toad caught, and the heaviest weight of toads caught. In 2015,  of toads were caught. In 2016, a drier year,  of toads were caught. Cane toad races are popular in some towns and pubs. Toads are given humorous names and punters can bid or buy a toad or bet on them as in horse racing. Entrants or the winners commonly have to kiss their toads.

The introduction and subsequent migration of the cane toad in Australia was popularised by the film Cane Toads: An Unnatural History (1988), which tells the tale with a humorous edge and is often shown in environmental science courses. Don Spencer, a popular children's entertainer, sang the song "Warts 'n' All", which was used in the documentary. A longer sequel, Cane Toads: The Conquest, by the same filmmaker, was made in 2010. 
 
The short film Cane Toad – What happened to Baz? displays an Australian attitude towards the cane toad. This film won the "Best Comedy" award at the 2003 St Kilda Film Festival.

A controversial commercial for Tooheys beer company showed people from New South Wales standing at the New South Wales-Queensland border with golf clubs and lights, attracting cane toads just so they could hit them back across the border with the golf clubs.

The Cane Toad Times was a satirical humour magazine based in Brisbane, Queensland.

The invasive nature of cane toads was referenced in The Simpsons episode "Bart vs. Australia". It was also parodied in the episode "Bart the Mother" in which an invasive lizard is dealt with by introducing other species.

See also
 Invasive species in Australia
 Conservation in Australia
 Toad Rage

References

Further reading

External links
 
 
 Summary of cane toad research in Australia
 Cane toad factsheet —Australian Museum (2003)
 The Cane Toad – Australia's Amphibian Plague at h2g2
 "Cane Toad – What Happened To Baz?" —the prize-winning Australian animated short, hosted on a German site
 Kimberley Toad Busters
 The Cane Toad (Bufo Marinus) —Department of the Environment, Water, Heritage and the Arts (2010)

Fauna naturalised in Australia
Invasive animal species in Australia